The Norfolk Coast Path is a long-distance footpath in Norfolk, running 83 miles (133.5 km) from Hunstanton to Hopton-on-Sea. It was opened in 1986 and covers the North Norfolk Coast AONB (Area of Outstanding Natural Beauty).

It links with the Peddars Way at Holme-next-the-Sea, and the two in combination form the Peddars Way & Norfolk Coast Path National Trail, one of 15 National Trails in England and Wales. It links to the Angles Way and the Wherryman's Way at Great Yarmouth, and to both ends of the Weavers' Way, at Cromer and Great Yarmouth. In December 2014, the trail was extended to Sea Palling and forms part of the England Coast Path. In October 2016, the trail was further extended to Hopton-on-Sea.

The Norfolk Coast Path passes through or near:

See also
 Recreational walks in Norfolk

References

External links
 Official Norfolk Coast Path Website

Footpaths in Norfolk
Long-distance footpaths in England
Coastal features of Norfolk
Protected areas of Norfolk
Coastal paths in England